James Shane (born 18 December 1989) is an English middle distance runner. He attended Mayflower School Billericay. Shane runs for Newham and Essex Beagles athletics club. He also holds a black belt in Judo.

International competitions

References
 

1989 births
Living people
British male middle-distance runners
English male middle-distance runners
British Athletics Championships winners